Policekaran Magal is a 1962 Indian Tamil-language drama film directed by C. V. Sridhar. Based on B. S. Ramiah's play of the same name, it stars Balaji, Muthuraman, Vijayakumari, Santha Kumari and Pushpalatha. The film was released on 7 September 1962 and was a success. It was later remade in Telugu as Constable Koothuru (1963) and in Malayalam as Vyaamoham (1978).

Plot 

Kumarasami, an honest police constable, has a son Chinnaiah and a daughter Janaki. Prabhu, son of a rich affluent person is a friend of Chinnaiah who often visit his house. Prabhu falls in love with Janaki to which she equally reciprocates. She meets Prabhu secretly without the knowledge of both her father and brother. One day, Prabhu's notorious friends commit a murder and they flee the scene via Prabhu's car. At the same point of time, Prabhu meets his love in a temple and promises to marry her.

Meanwhile, Prabhu's father plans to marry his son to one of his relatives. Prabhu initially discards this proposal but accepts after coming to know that he will be deprived of his father's wealth if he does not marry the girl arranged by his father. Janaki is shocked to hear this and finally tells her relationship with Prabhu to her parents. When Chinnaiah visits Prabhu's house to seek justice, Prabhu reiterates that Janaki is completely unknown to him. Janaki health begins to deteriorate and despite Prabhu's selfish motive, she prays for his good health.

Police arrest Prabhu for the murder committed by his friends and Janaki testifies as an alibi. Police arrest the actual murderers. A now regretful Prabhu comes to marry Janaki, but is too late. Janaki's health completely deteriorates and she eventually dies.

Cast 
Cast according to the opening credits of the film:

Male cast
 Balaji as Prabhu
 Muthuraman as Chinnaiah
 Sahasranamam as Constable Kumarasami
 Nagesh as Servant
 Muthaiah as Rajagopal
 Ramanathan
 Raghavan as Mallika's father
 Karikol Raj as Janaki's uncle
 K. Nataraj as Advocate
 Veerappan as Somu
 Chandrababu as Maari
 Film News Anandan as police photographer (uncredited)

Female cast
 Vijayakumari as Janaki
 Santha Kumari as Amrtham
 Pushpalatha as Mallika
 Manorama as Maari's Fiancée
 Sakunthala as Malathi

Production 
Policekaran Magal was based on the stage play of the same name written by B. S. Ramiah. S. V. Sahasranamam and R. Muthuraman who were part of the play reprised their roles in the film. C. R. Vijayakumari played the titular daughter of Sahasranamam's character, a policeman, while K. Balaji played a youth who cheats the policeman's daughter. The dialogues were written by Thanjai N. Ramaiah Dass.

Soundtrack 
The soundtrack was composed by Viswanathan–Ramamoorthy (a duo consisting of M. S. Viswanathan and T. K. Ramamoorthy) while the lyrics written by Kannadasan. The song "Ponn Enbean Siru" is set in the Carnatic raga known as Darbari Kanada. The song "Nilavukku Enmel Ennadi Kobam" attained popularity.

Release 
Policekaran Magal was released on 7 September 1962, and emerged a commercial success.

Remakes 
Policekaran Magal was remade in Telugu as Constable Koothuru (1963), and in Malayalam as Vyaamoham (1978).

References

External links 

1960s Tamil-language films
1962 drama films
1962 films
Fictional portrayals of the Tamil Nadu Police
Films about siblings
Films directed by C. V. Sridhar
Films scored by Viswanathan–Ramamoorthy
Films with screenplays by C. V. Sridhar
Indian drama films
Indian films based on plays
Tamil films remade in other languages